Orange Coast College (OCC) is a public community college in Costa Mesa in Orange County, California. It was founded in 1947, with its first classes opening in the fall of 1948. It provides Associate of Art and Associate of Science degrees, certificates of achievement, and lower-division classes transferable to other colleges and universities. The school enrolls approximately 24,000 undergraduate students. In terms of population size, Orange Coast College is the third-largest college in Orange County.

History
Orange Coast College was formed after local voters passed a measure in the January 1947 election to establish a new junior college on a  site, secured from the War Assets Administration in Washington, D.C, and part of the  deactivated Santa Ana Army Air Base.

The first official District board of trustees hired the college's founding president and district superintendent, Basil Hyrum Peterson, on July 28, 1947. Construction of campus classrooms and facilities began when Dr. Peterson hired Fran Albers as the college's carpenter in February 1948. Albers' crew of 35 workers (mostly Coast football players paid 60 cents an hour) turned an Army movie theatre into an auditorium and concert hall; a service club into a 500-seat gymnasium; an Army chapel into a facility for theatre productions and student/staff weddings; a military storage building into a library; an Army PX into a student center; a battalion headquarters building into an administration building; and several cadet barracks into student dormitories and married student and faculty housing.

The first campus building phase occurred in the early 1950s when renowned architect Richard Neutra was brought in to re-design the campus. Leaving many of the original buildings intact, Neutra added several modernist structures including the strikingly minimalist Campus Theater and two large lecture halls. These were laid out on a 45-degree angle to the city street grid, in much the same manner as The Parkinsons' layout of USC. The second and largest building phase occurred in the 1970s when local architect William Blurock was hired to replace many of the original Army buildings with structures more suitable for educational purposes.

Since then the OCC Foundation, using funds designated for the Orange Coast College School of Sailing & Seamanship, has refurbished the facilities on the island, made significant capital improvements, and has helped fund the use of the island as a field station to teach summer classes in Island Ecology, Biological Diversity, Vertebrate Biology, Intertidal Ecology, kayaking, and photography. It is now referred to as "Wheeler Station" at Rabbit Island (in honor of the donor, Henry Wheeler). OCC marine science and biology instructors have used the island to conduct research on species diversity, standing stock, species distribution, and oceanography. Plans were underway to find separate funding for the island outside of OCC. Possible funding sources included the National Science Foundation, rental of the island facilities to Canadians, funding from the Associated Students of OCC (ASOCC), and through other foundation grants and private donations. In March 2007, the Orange Coast College Foundation Board of Directors voted to sell the island after determining that keeping and maintaining it was unfeasible. As of July 2007, the island was in talks to be sold to a private party for $2.41 million. However, the sale did not materialize and the island was sold in March 2008 to a privately held Canadian corporation for $2.19 million.

In 2015, a plan is in effect to remove the early Neutra buildings in the center of the campus and open up a large central park around which both the outlying 1970s buildings and several newer buildings will be clustered.

2016 recording controversy
In November 2016, an OCC student recorded a lecture by a professor of human sexuality, violating the school's Student Code of Conduct. In the lecture, the professor criticized President Donald Trump and Vice President Mike Pence, calling their election "an act of terrorism" against members of the LGBTQ community. The student shared the recording with a student club on campus, which then posted it on their public Facebook page. The video promptly went viral, sparking backlash and death threats against the professor.

After an investigation, the student was suspended for one semester, and required to write an essay and apologize to the professor. After public outcry, the punishment was overturned in a special meeting of the Coast Community College District Board of Trustees, in the interest of bringing "closure to a chain of events that has led to the distress for many, most especially, an OCC teacher and student."

In 2017, the professor was awarded the Faculty of the Year award by her peers, which she declined to accept and did not want to participate in related activities.

Organization and admissions

The college is one of three in the Coast Community College District, a regional organization providing administrative services and funding for post-secondary education. The district is chartered by the state of California to provide community college services.

The mission of OCC is to provide inexpensive education in the trades, licensed trades and skilled professions, as well as remedial and transferable lower-division courses for students who plan to transfer to either a California State University or University of California campus.

Orange Coast College is one of the top transfer institutions in the country. OCC ranks third across California for combined UC and CSU transfers. The college ranks 65th out of more than 5,000 community colleges in the United States in awarding associate degrees.

For California residents, costs are $46 per unit. For non-residents, costs are about $150 per unit. A typical two-year program has 60 units. All students who are over 18 years of age and can benefit from the services at OCC, qualify for admission.

Students who are under 18 years of age must show any one of the following,

 A high school diploma
 The California High School Certificate of Proficiency or equivalent
 Completion of the 10th grade and the Early Start Petition form.

Academics
OCC is accredited by the Western Association of Schools and Colleges, Accrediting Commission for Community and Junior Colleges. It also has specialized accreditation by American Dental Association (Commission on Dental Accreditation), the American Dietetic Association (Commission on Accreditation for Dietetics Education), and the Joint Review Committee on Education in Radiologic Technology.

Student life

OCC has active clubs, competitive sport teams, and an involved Associated Student Body. However, the campus community is less social than a four-year institution because it is primarily a commuter college serving local people.

On-campus housing is not available, and local housing is expensive, approximately $1100 per month for a small single-bedroom apartment. Local rooms in houses rent for about $750 per month. 
 
Many changes have been going on at Orange Coast College. A new library was opened in January 2008, the Lewis Science Building was remodeled, and a Starbucks was built by the new Art Center. It is the only community college in Orange County that has its own Starbucks.

Construction on a new Math, Business and Computing Center is slated to be complete in the fall of 2015. Constructions projects scheduled to break ground in the near future include a 120-seat Planetarium, and an expanded Recycling Center. The recently remodeled student resource center, Watson Hall, contains:
 Counseling Center
 Records and Admissions
 Transfer Center
 Career Center
 Career Library
 International Center
 Academic Honors Office
 Re-Entry Center
 Financial Aid
 Veterans' Services
 Assessment Center
 Puente Program

Athletics
Orange Coast College sponsors 25 sports programs. The 12 men's sports programs are baseball, basketball, crew, cross country, football, golf, soccer, swimming, tennis, track and field, volleyball and water polo. The 13 women's programs are cheerleading/dance, basketball, beach volleyball, crew, cross country, golf, soccer, softball, swimming, tennis, track and field, volleyball and water polo.

LeBard Stadium is located on the campus.

The Los Angeles Chargers have held training camp and regular season practices at the campus facilities.

Coast Report
The Coast Report has been OCC's campus newspaper since 1948. The Coast Report currently distributes 5,000 copies of their paper throughout the campus every week on Wednesdays. The Coast Report also maintains the Coast Report Online, which is an online version of the paper. The faculty adviser for the paper is Dr. Jeremy Shermak.

Student body

OCC has a total enrollment of 24,783 students, of which 16,384 are degree seeking undergraduates. Ninety-seven percent of incoming students are drawn from California, and 3% are from out of state. Thirty-five percent of students are part-time. As of fall 2007, the proportion of students with a B.A. or higher is 10%.

Notable alumni
 Craig Amerkhanian, rower and rowing coach
 Pham Xuan An, journalist and spy
 Blake Anderson, comedian and actor
 Gustavo Arellano, journalist and columnist
 Scott Aukerman, writer, actor
 Scott Beerer, Major League Baseball player
 Carlos Bilbao, Member of the Idaho House of Representatives
 Beverly Bivens, lead singer of We Five
 Brandon Brennan, MLB pitcher for the Boston Red Sox
 Venus D-Lite, drag queen, Madonna impersonator, and contestant on RuPaul's Drag Race (season 3).
 David Denman, actor
 Adam Devine, comedian and actor
 Tom Dumont, guitarist and producer
 Rob Enderle, consultant
 Bob Ernst, collegiate and Olympic rowing coach
 Paul Frank, artist and fashion designer
 Denny Fitzpatrick, basketball player
 Rebecca Forstadt, (aka Reba West), actress
 Tiki Ghosn, professional mixed martial artist, at one time competing in Strikeforce, the WEC, and the Ultimate Fighting Championship
 Roark Gourley, painter, sculptor
 Matthew Harper, American politician. California State Assemblyman, 74th District, and the 59th Mayor of Huntington Beach (2013–2014).
 Don Hồ, singer
 Michael Irby, actor
 Chris Jackson, Arena Football League player
 Casey Jennings, beach volleyball player
 Eddie Johnson, NFL and CFL player
 Ross Johnson, politician
 William Katt, actor
 Diane Keaton, actress
 Starr Parodi, Grammy-winning pianist, composer & music producer. Keyboardist on The Arsenio Hall Show.
 Curtiss King, singer, producer
 Brian Krause, actor
 Tom Kubis, jazz composer/arranger
 Miracle Laurie, actress
 Larry Lee, baseball coach
 Cliff Livingston, NFL player
Brent Mayne, MLB Catcher
Sabina Mazo, Colombian Mixed Martial Artist 
 Scott Mosier, film producer
 Dustin Nguyen, actor
 Henry Nguyen, basketball player for the Hochiminh City Wings
 Quinn Norton, journalist
 Raymond Obstfeld, author and professor
 Dan O'Mahony, singer, author, activist, journalist
 Carlos Palomino, professional boxer
 Audrina Patridge, reality-show cast member, The Hills and actress
 Kenda Perez, model, host
 B. J. Porter, writer, actor
 Russ Purnell, NFL assistant coach
 Dan Quisenberry, MLB pitcher
 Benny Ricardo, NFL player
 Francisco Rivera, football player; professional mixed martial artist, current UFC Bantamweight
 Sergio Romo, MLB pitcher
 Jack Scott, Member of the California Senate
 Dave Staton, MLB Player
 Jim Steffen, NFL player
 Shay Spitz, soccer player
 Andy Strouse, soccer player
 Steve Timmons, 2× Olympic gold medalist, Volleyball
 Alika DeRego, US Open National Champion, Volleyball
 Patrick Warburton, actor
 Greg Willard, basketball referee
 John Vallely, NBA player
 Minoti Vaishnav, songwriter and screenwriter
 Scott Weiland, singer and musician

References

External links
Official website
Coast Report student newspaper

Universities and colleges in Orange County, California
California Community Colleges
Buildings and structures in Costa Mesa, California
Educational institutions established in 1947
Sports in Costa Mesa, California
1947 establishments in California
Richard Neutra buildings
Schools accredited by the Western Association of Schools and Colleges
Two-year colleges in the United States